Virginia Marlita "Penny" Toler (born March 24, 1966) is an American basketball executive and former player who served most recently as the general manager of the Los Angeles Sparks of the Women's National Basketball Association (WNBA). Toler holds the distinction of scoring the first basket in WNBA history.

College years
Toler began her college career at San Diego State, sat out a year, and then transferred to Long Beach State, where she became an All-American basketball player.  During her career Long Beach State made it to the Final Four twice, in 1987 and 1988.  Toler was considered one of the best ever collegiate players under future Hall of Fame coach Joan Bonvicini. In 1995 she was inducted into the Long Beach State Athletic Hall of Fame.

Long Beach State statistics

Source

Professional career
Having no viable domestic professional options, Toler began her professional career in Italy, playing two seasons for Montecchio and three for Pescara. She then played two seasons in Greece for Sporting Flash, and one in Israel for Ramat HaSharon. In 1997, she returned to the United States to play in the newly organized WNBA.

Toler was a point guard allocated to the Los Angeles Sparks during the player initiation round in the 1997 WNBA draft.  She is most commonly remembered as the first player to score a basket in the WNBA.  She did so against the New York Liberty on June 21, 1997 19:01 hour at the Los Angeles Great Western Forum.  Her shot was a side jumper.  Toler also made the first free throw in the WNBA history.

In November 1999 she retired as a player to become the general manager of the Los Angeles Sparks.   Immediately after taking on a management role, she would assemble the Los Angeles Sparks roster that would become the championship team in 2001.

Among all professional men or women sports leagues, Toler would become the fastest person to go from a player to general manager status to winning a championship in two years.

On July 20, 2014, Toler was named as interim head coach following the firing of Carol Ross.

Toler was fired as vice president and general manager on October 4, 2019, after the Sparks were swept out of the WNBA semifinals during the 2019 WNBA Playoffs. The move also came after the revelation that Toler entered the Sparks' locker room following their Game 2 loss and gave an obscenity-laced speech that included the use of the "N-word".

International career
By the time the WNBA launched, Toler had already spent eight years playing basketball overseas.  She has played five seasons in Italy, two seasons in Greece, and a season in Israel.  While in Italy, she won a scoring title, two assist titles, and was MVP of the Italian all-star game.

Career statistics

Regular season

|-
| style="text-align:left;"|1997
| style="text-align:left;"|Los Angeles
| 28 || 28 || 32.4 || .426 || .184 || .839 || 3.4 || 5.1 || 1.3 || 0.1 || 3.8 || 13.1
|-
| style="text-align:left;"|1998
| style="text-align:left;"|Los Angeles
| 30 || 30 || 31.5 || .415 || .417 || .743 || 3.5 || 4.8 || 1.1 || 0.1 || 3.3 || 12.3
|-
| style="text-align:left;"|1999
| style="text-align:left;"|Los Angeles
| 30 || 4 || 14.2 || .340 || .154 || .867 || 1.4 || 2.2 || 0.4 || 0.0 || 1.3 || 4.8
|-
| style="text-align:left;"|Career
| style="text-align:left;"|3 years, 1 team
| 88 || 62 || 25.9 || .406 || .306 || .811 || 2.8 || 4.0 || 0.9 || 0.1 || 2.8 || 10.0

Playoffs

|-
| style="text-align:left;"|1999
| style="text-align:left;"|Los Angeles
| 4 || 0 || 10.5 || .333 || .000 || .500 || 1.5 || 0.5 || 0.5 || 0.0 || 0.8 || 2.5

References

External links
 USATODAY Recognition

1966 births
Living people
All-American college women's basketball players
American expatriate basketball people in Greece
American expatriate basketball people in Israel
American expatriate basketball people in Italy
American women's basketball coaches
American women's basketball players
Basketball players from Washington, D.C.
Long Beach State Beach women's basketball players
Los Angeles Sparks head coaches
Los Angeles Sparks players
Place of birth missing (living people)
Point guards
San Diego State Aztecs women's basketball players
Women's National Basketball Association executives
Women in American professional sports management
Women's National Basketball Association general managers